Centrifugal casting is a metallurgical manufacturing process by casting that may refer to either:

 Centrifugal casting (industrial), on an industrial scale
 Centrifugal casting (silversmithing), for a smaller scale

See also: Spin casting